Bartians may refer:
Bartians, an extinct Prussian tribe
Inhabitants of Saint Barthélemy
Inhabitants of Bartlesville, Oklahoma